Innopolis University is a university located in the city of Innopolis. The university was established on 10 December 2012 and specializes in information technology and robotics, as well as the development of information technology both internationally and in Russia; as of 2016, it has an enrollment rate of 3%, with a tuition of $20,000 per year.

Construction of the university began on 9 June 2012; in 2013, it was estimated that the university would be open by 2015. Its first bachelor program opened in 2014. By the same year, partner universities included Carnegie Mellon University and the National University of Singapore. Innopolis University would sign academic agreements with the University of Bonn, Innsbruck University, Harbour.Space University and the Sapienza University of Rome in 2016. On 26 April 2019, ownership of the university was transferred to the Ministry of Digital Development, Communications and Mass Media.

As of 2017, Innopolis University offers 4 master's degree courses, as well as a bachelor program in computer science and engineering; facilities at the university include a swimming pool and a sports center.  The university also operates 11 laboratories, which are divided into 3 institutes.

References

External links
 

Buildings and structures built in the Soviet Union
Public universities and colleges in Russia
Educational institutions established in 2012
Universities in Tatarstan
2012 establishments in Russia